Clock Tower, Sukkur, also known as Ghanta Ghar, Sukkur, is a clock tower located in Sukkur, Sindh. The tower is 90-feet high.

History
Clock Tower, Sukkur was constructed by a Hindu businessman, Seth Wadho Mal Nebhau Mal Manjhari, at the Silver Jubilee of George V. The clock tower was inaugurated in 1937 by UM Mirchandani, the then Collector of Sukkur.

In 1994, its four clocks were stolen by an unknown person.

References

Tourist attractions in Sukkur
Clock towers in Pakistan
1937 establishments in British India